A total solar eclipse occurred on August 9, 1896. A solar eclipse occurs when the Moon passes between Earth and the Sun, thereby totally or partly obscuring the image of the Sun for a viewer on Earth. A total solar eclipse occurs when the Moon's apparent diameter is larger than the Sun's, blocking all direct sunlight, turning day into darkness. Totality occurs in a narrow path across Earth's surface, with the partial solar eclipse visible over a surrounding region thousands of kilometres wide.
It was visible across Europe, Asia, and Japan.

It is a part of solar Saros 124.

This event was the subject of the first organized eclipse expedition by the British Astronomical Association. A group of 165 amateur and profession astronomers sailed from Tilbury, England on July 25th, heading toward Vadsø, Norway. This expedition failed to produce any usable results as they were frustrated by the weather conditions at the time of the eclipse. However, a smaller expedition to Novaya Zemlya on Sir George Baden-Powell's yacht Otario met with success.

Gallery

References

External links

 NASA graphics
 Googlemap
 NASA Besselian elements
 Corona and Coronet: Being a narrative of the Amherst Eclipse Expedition to Japan, in Mr. James's Schooner-Yacht Coronet, to Observe the Sun's Total Obscuration, 9th August, 1896, by Mabel Loomis Todd, Houghton, Mifflin and Company, publishers, 1898
 
 Solar eclipse of August 9, 1896 in Russia

1896 08 09
1896 in science
1896 08 09
August 1896 events